Samueli Dawai Naulu, (5 January 1982 – 30 March 2013), was a Fijian rugby union footballer. He was born in Narewa, Nadi. He played as a wing. He played for the USA Perpignan team in the Heineken Cup as well as playing for the same team in the French Top 14 Competition.

Samueli was 1.94 m (6' 4") tall and weighed 116 kg (18 st 3 lb). When he joined Perpignan he used to play as a flanker but because the coach thought he would make a good winger he was trialled at the wing.  He became USA Perpignan's first choice winger after joining the side after playing Rugby league.

He died on 30 March 2013 after his car collided with a tree in around 5am, 20 km south of Bergerac in Issigeac, France.

References

External links
Samueli Naulu's profile on ercrugby.com

1982 births
2013 deaths
Fijian rugby union players
Rugby union wings
USA Perpignan players
Road incident deaths in France
Fijian expatriate rugby union players
Expatriate rugby union players in France
Fijian expatriate sportspeople in France
Sportspeople from Nadi
I-Taukei Fijian people